The 1976 United States Senate election in Vermont took place on November 2, 1976. Incumbent Republican Robert Stafford successfully ran for re-election to another term in the United States Senate, defeating Democratic candidate Governor Thomas P. Salmon.

Republican primary

Results

Democratic primary

Results

General election

Results

See also 
 1976 United States Senate elections

References

Vermont
1976
United States Senate